Big Game: The NFL in Dangerous Times is a 2018 book by Mark Leibovich that examines the National Football League.

References

2018 non-fiction books
English-language books
Penguin Press books
National Football League